Max Thomas Meyer (born March 12, 1999) is an American professional baseball pitcher for the Miami Marlins of Major League Baseball (MLB). Meyer was selected third overall by the Marlins in the 2020 Major League Baseball draft.

Amateur career
Meyer grew up in Woodbury, Minnesota and attended Woodbury High School where he played baseball and hockey. He committed to play college baseball at the University of Minnesota during his junior year. As a senior, Meyer had a 7–1 win–loss record with a 1.01 earned run average (ERA) and 51 strikeouts in  innings pitched while batting .421. He was named All-Metro by the Star Tribune. Meyer was drafted in the 34th round of the 2017 Major League Baseball draft by the Minnesota Twins, but did not sign.

Meyer enrolled at the University of Minnesota to play college baseball for the Minnesota Golden Gophers. He served as the Gophers' closer as a true freshman, finishing the season tied for the school record for saves in a season with 16 and a 2.06 ERA with 54 strikeouts in  innings pitched. He was named a Freshman All-American by the National Collegiate Baseball Writers Association (NCBWA) and by Perfect Game as well as a third team All-American by the American Baseball Coaches Association (ABCA) and the Collegiate Baseball Newspaper. During the summer, Meyer played for the Team USA Collegiate National Baseball Team, serving as the team's closer leading the team with seven saves. As a sophomore, Meyer went 5–3 with two saves and posted a 2.11 ERA and 87 strikeouts while also increasing his playing time in the outfield and batted .256 and was named second team All-Big Ten Conference and a semifinalist for the John Olerud Award. He returned to the US Collegiate National Team after the season and posted a team-best 0.64 ERA with 12 strikeouts in four appearances (three starts).

Going into his junior season, Meyer was named a preseason All-American by four different outlets, placed on the watch list for the Golden Spikes Award and was a top prospect for the 2020 Major League Baseball draft. He went 3–1 with a 1.95 ERA, 0.83 walks plus hits per inning pitched (WHIP) ratio and 46 strikeouts in  innings pitched before the season was cut short due to the coronavirus pandemic.

Professional career
The Miami Marlins selected Meyer in the first round, with the third overall selection, in the 2020 Major League Baseball draft. He signed with the Marlins for a $6.7 million signing bonus.

Meyer made his professional debut in 2021 with the Pensacola Blue Wahoos of the Double-A South and was promoted to the Jacksonville Jumbo Shrimp of the Triple-A East in September. Over 22 starts between the two clubs, Meyer pitched to a 6–4 record, a 2.27 ERA, and 130 strikeouts over 111 innings. Meyer was selected to play in the 2021 All-Star Futures Game. He opened the 2022 season back with Jacksonville. 

On July 16, 2022, Meyer had his contract selected to the 40-man roster and he was promoted to the major leagues for the first time. In his second MLB start against the Pittsburgh Pirates on July 23, he left the game with elbow discomfort. On August 9, Meyer underwent Tommy John surgery, with a recovery timetable causing him to miss the remainder of the 2022 season and likely most of the 2023 season.

References

Further reading

External links

Minnesota Golden Gophers bio

1999 births
Living people
People from Woodbury, Minnesota
Baseball players from Minnesota
Major League Baseball pitchers
Miami Marlins players
Minnesota Golden Gophers baseball players
United States national baseball team players
Pensacola Blue Wahoos players
Jacksonville Jumbo Shrimp players
Jupiter Hammerheads players